James Montgomery Richardson (July 1, 1858 – February 9, 1925) was a U.S. Representative from Kentucky.

Born in Mobile, Alabama, Richardson moved to Glasgow, Kentucky, in early youth and resided with his uncle.
He attended the common schools.
He became editor of the Glasgow (Kentucky) Times in 1878.
He served as delegate to the Democratic National Convention in 1896.
He served as member of the State house of representatives in 1896.
He served as prison commissioner from 1900 to 1905, when he resigned, having been elected to Congress.

Richardson was elected as a Democrat to the Fifty-ninth Congress (March 4, 1905 – March 3, 1907).
He was an unsuccessful candidate for reelection.
He resumed newspaper activities.
Postmaster at Glasgow from May 22, 1913, to May 9, 1922.
He died in Glasgow, Kentucky, February 9, 1925.
He was interred in Glasgow Cemetery.

References

1858 births
1925 deaths
Editors of Kentucky newspapers
Democratic Party members of the Kentucky House of Representatives
Politicians from Mobile, Alabama
Democratic Party members of the United States House of Representatives from Kentucky
American male journalists
Journalists from Alabama